Mouramba County is one of the 141 Cadastral divisions of New South Wales.

Mouramba is believed to be derived from a local Aboriginal word and is the name of nearby Mouramba Station.

Parishes within this county
The parishes in the county, and mapping coordinates to the approximate centre of each, are:

All are in Cobar Shire.

References

Counties of New South Wales